The 1st Arkansas Cavalry Regiment, colloquially known as Dobbins' Arkansas Cavalry Regiment, was a cavalry formation of the Confederate States Army during the American Civil War commanded by Colonel Archibald S. Dobbins.

Organization 
The nucleus of what became Dobbins' regiment was Maj. Francis Marion Chrisman's battalion of four companies, organized on September 28, 1862. Chrisman's battalion was assigned to Parson's Cavalry Brigade, 1st Corps, Trans-Mississippi Department, from September to December 1862; after which it was reported as an unattached command in the District of Arkansas until about January 1863, when it was increased to a regiment and designated as the 1st (Dobbins') Regiment Arkansas Cavalry.

The additional companies which were joined with Chrisman's four companies were five "partisan ranger" companies and one "spy" company. "Corley's Spies" (which became Company A, Capt. Samuel Corley commanding) was not a group of secret agents; rather, they were expert scouts who knew the bayous, forests, roads and trails of eastern Arkansas like the back of their hands. They were skilled at moving around undetected by the Yankees. I once found some correspondence regarding the resignation of Corley's first lieutenant, which revealed that "Corley's Spies" had served briefly in the Indian Territory in Albert Pike's command. When the regiment was organized, Captain Corley was promoted to major. Samuel Corley was one of those larger-than-life characters whose daring exploits would make a great book and movie. He was a preacher who talked about Christian love and forgiveness on Sunday, and fought Yankees like the devil during the week. He was killed in action at Fourche Bayou (Battle of Little Rock) on September 10, 1863.

The component companies (and original captains) of Dobbins' regiment were as follows:

Company A – Capt. Samuel Corley, of Phillips County. Formerly known as Corley's Company, Chrisman's Battalion:
Company B – Capt. Rufus D. Anderson of Phillips County. Formerly known as Anderson's Company.
Company C – Capt. James H. McGehee of St. Francis County. Formerly known as McGhees Company,
Company D – Capt. George W. Rutherford of Independence County. Formerly known as Rutherford's Company.
Company E – Capt. Morgan M. Bateman of Jackson County. Also known as Bateman's Company.
Company F – Capt. Robert C. Nall of St. Francis County.
Company G – Capt. James F. Barton of Crittenden County. Also known as Barton's Company.
Company H – Capt. William R. Coody of Woodruff County.
Company I – Capt. John T. West of Independence County.
Company K – Capt. William Weatherly of Phillips County.

Company F was consolidated with Company A on January 3, 1864.

Companies D & H were consolidated with Company E on January 3, 1864.

The original regimental staff officers were:
Colonel Archibald S. Dobbins
Lieutenant Colonel F. M. Chrisman
Major Samuel Corley

The unit is difficult to research because not only was it a loosely organized regiment, but most of the typical paperwork generated by a regiment in the field is missing from the record. Only a handful of muster rolls, and almost no quartermaster or commissary reports, are known to exist.

Battles 
When organized, Dobbins' regiment was listed as an unattached command in the District of Arkansas until May 1863. From June through September 1863 it was assigned to the Arkansas Cavalry Brigade of General Walker's Division, and in November 1863 listed as Dobbins' Cavalry Brigade, District of Arkansas.

Its major engagements were the Battle of Helena (July 4, 1863), the Battle of Bayou Fourche (September 10, 1863) and the Battle of Pine Bluff (October 25, 1863). But for most of its existence, Dobbins' regiment was engaged in numerous scouts, raids and skirmishes throughout eastern and northeastern Arkansas. The companies frequently operated independently.

Colonel Dobbins was court-martialed and dismissed from the service on November 23, 1863. The court martial resulted from Colonel Dobbins' refusal to accept orders from General John S. Marmaduke because Marmaduke had killed Brigadier General L. M. Walker in a duel just before the Battle of Little Rock. The official records indicate that the regiment was broken up about January 3, 1864, and elements of the regiment were attached to, but not formally consolidated with, Col. Thomas J. Morgan's regiment.

Dobbins' Arkansas Cavalry was engaged in the following battles:

Battle of Helena, Arkansas July 4, 1863
Battle of Bayou Fourche September 10, 1863
Battle of Pine Bluff, Arkansas, October 25, 1863
Price's Missouri Expedition, Arkansas-Missouri-Kansas, September–October, 1864
Battle of Fort Davidson, Missouri, September 27, 1864
Fourth Battle of Boonville, Missouri, October 11, 1864
Battle of Glasgow, Missouri, October 15, 1864
Battle of Sedalia, Missouri, October 15, 1864
Second Battle of Lexington, Missouri, October 19, 1864
Battle of Little Blue River, Missouri, October 21, 1864
Second Battle of Independence, Missouri, October 21–22, 1864
Battle of Byram's Ford, Missouri, October 22–23, 1864
Battle of Westport, Missouri, October 23, 1864
Battle of Marais des Cygnes, Linn County, Kansas, October 25, 1864
Battle of Mine Creek, Missouri, October 25, 1864
Battle of Marmiton River, Missouri, October 25, 1864
Second Battle of Newtonia, Missouri, October 28, 1864

Flag 

Dobbins' regimental colors were captured by Indiana cavalry near Tulip, Arkansas, in October 1863. Colonel Powell Clayton with three hundred and fifty men the 1st Indiana Cavalry and four pieces of light artillery, making a circuitous route, marching ninety miles in thirty-three hours, succeeded in surprising and completely routing Colonel Dobbins' cavalry brigade at Tulip, Arkansas, capturing one stand of colors, all his camp and garrison equipage, quartermaster and commissary stores, medical supplies, transportation, etc.  The captured flag was returned to Arkansas in 1962 by the Governor of Indiana, and is currently located in the collections of the Old State House Museum in Little Rock, Arkansas. This cotton flag measures 53" x 72" with a dark blue field with a red "upright" cross. The cross is 6" wide. There are 13 white, 5-pointed, 3" stars on the crossbars. The leading edge has been doubled back to form a sleeve, 2" wide when flat with pairs of ties at each end for securing the flag to its staff. Trans-Mississippi Pattern Battle Flag of Dobbins 1st Arkansas Cavalry Regiment. The flag is sometimes referred to as a Polk Pattern flag after the flag used by General Leonidas Polk's Corps east of the Mississippi River, but Dobbins' unit never served in Polk's Corps and Dobbins' flag is slightly different from the Polk Pattern. The late Howard Madaus deemed Dobbins' flag a "Trans-Mississippi pattern" unique to that theater. One other flag of the same style exists in the Iowa collections captured at Helena in July 1863.

Surrender 
At the end of the civil war, most of the former companies of Dobbins' regiment were paroled (still with the designation 1st Arkansas Cavalry) at Wittsburg, Arkansas, on May 25, 1865. Two of the companies were paroled at Jacksonport on June 5, 1865. Colonel Dobbins, was paroled at Galveston, Texas, on July 13, 1865, where he signed his parole as colonel, commanding 1st Brigade, Arkansas Cavalry.

See also 

 List of Arkansas Civil War Confederate units

Notes

References

Bibliography 
 Maxfield, T. "George W. Rutherford's Company C, 1st Arkansas Cavalry." (Prepared by N. Britton.) Independence County Chronicle, 25, No. 3/4 (April–July 1984): 33-35.
 Dedmondt, Glenn. "The Flags Of Civil War Arkansas" (Pelican Publishing Co., 2009). page 106.

External links 

 Thomas Jacob Barb, Manuscripts of the American Civil War, University of Notre Dame
 Edward G. Gerdes Civil War Home Page
 The Encyclopedia of Arkansas History and Culture
 The War of the Rebellion: a Compilation of the Official Records of the Union and Confederate Armies
 The Arkansas History Commission, State Archives, Civil War in Arkansas

1862 establishments in Arkansas
1865 disestablishments in Arkansas
Military units and formations established in 1862
Military units and formations disestablished in 1865
Trans-Mississippi Department
Units and formations of the Confederate States Army from Arkansas